The 2010 Cape Verdean Football Championship season was the 31st of the competition of the first-tier football in Cape Verde. Its started on 8 May, slightly later than the last season and finished on 10 July, later than last year. The tournament was organized by the Cape Verdean Football Federation. It was the second consecutive time that the final featured two clubs from the same island and city, the next time it happened would be five years later. It brought the Capital Rivalry between Sporting and Boavista to the national championships. Another club of Praia named Boavista FC (Cape Verde) winning the national title breaking Sporting Praia's consecutive title wins. A month later, Boavista Praia would become the only club to win both the championship and the cup title in the same season.

Overview 
Sporting Clube da Praia was again the defending team of the title. A total of 12 clubs participated in the competition, one from each island league and one who won the last season's title. 36 matches were played and 110 goals were scored. It marked the last appearance of Botafogo of the island of Fogo.

The biggest win were Sporting (2-7 defeated Ribeira Brava) and Boavista (7-1 defeated Solpontense).

The final round match between Ribeira Brava and Barrererense was not played, later, the federation awarded both teams a loss.

Participating clubs 

 Sporting Clube da Praia, winner of the 2009 Cape Verdean Football Championships
 Sporting Clube da Boa Vista, winner of the Boa Vista Island League
 SC Morabeza, winner of the Brava Island League
 Botafogo FC, winner of the Fogo Island League
 Barreirense, winner of the Maio Island League
 Académico do Aeroporto, winner of the Sal Island League
 Scorpion Vermelho, winner of the Santiago Island League (North)
 Boavista FC (Cape Verde), runner-up of the Santiago Island League (South)
 Solpontense FC, winner of the Santo Antão Island League (North)
 Marítimo, winner of the Santo Antão Island League (South)
 Desportivo Ribeira Brava, winner of the São Nicolau Island League
 Batuque FC, winner of the São Vicente Island League

Information about the clubs

League standings 
 Group A 

 Group B

Results

Final Stages

Semi-finals

Finals

Statistics 
 Biggest win: Boavista FC 7 - 1 Solpontense (May 30)

See also 
 2009–10 in Cape Verdean football
 2010 Cape Verdean Cup

Footnotes

External links 
 
 https://web.archive.org/web/20150713074425/http://www.rsssf.com/tablesk/kaapv2010.html

Cape Verdean Football Championship seasons
2009–10 in Cape Verdean football
Cape